Bocage's bushshrike (Chlorophoneus bocagei), also known as the grey-green bushshrike, is a species of bird in the family Malaconotidae.  It is scatteredly present throughout central Africa.  Its natural habitats are subtropical or tropical dry forest and subtropical or tropical moist lowland forest.

References

 BirdLife International 2016.  [BirdLife International. 2016. Chlorophoneus bocagei. The IUCN Red List of Threatened Species 2016: e.T22707638A94132789. https://dx.doi.org/10.2305/IUCN.UK.2016-3.RLTS.T22707638A94132789.en. Downloaded on 7 December 2018]

External links
photo at World Bird Gallery

Bocage's bushshrike
Birds of Central Africa
Bocage's bushshrike
Taxonomy articles created by Polbot